"Anything That's Rock 'n' Roll" is the second UK single from Tom Petty and the Heartbreakers' self-titled debut album. It was their first UK hit, peaking at #36 the week ending July 2, 1977.  It was not released as a single in the United States.

The B-side "Fooled Again (I Don't Like It)" is a live version taken from The Official Live Bootleg.

A live version of the song, recorded on November 11, 1977 at Capitol Studios in Hollywood, was included on the 2018 box set An American Treasure.

Charts

References

External links
 

1976 songs
American power pop songs
Tom Petty songs
Songs written by Tom Petty
Shelter Records singles
Song recordings produced by Denny Cordell